Luiz Antônio de Souza Soares (born 11 March 1991), known as Luiz Antônio, is a Brazilian footballer for Lamphun Warriors. Mainly a defensive midfielder, he can also play as a right back.

Club career

Flamengo
Born in Rio de Janeiro, Luiz Antônio joined Flamengo's youth setup in 2003, aged 11. He made his first team – and Série A – debut on 19 June 2011, in a 0–0 home draw against Botafogo.

On 26 August 2011 Luiz Antônio renewed his contract until 2016, but subsequently suffered a shoulder injury which kept him out for the remainder of the campaign. He scored his first professional goal on 25 January of the following year, but in a 1–2 Copa Libertadores away loss against Real Potosí.

Sport (loan)
On 29 December 2015, Luiz Antônio agreed to a one-year loan deal with fellow top tier club Sport. A starter during the 2016 Campeonato Pernambucano, he was rarely used in the year's Brasileirão, and rescinded his contract.

Bahia (loan)
Immediately after rescinding with Sport, Luiz Antônio joined Bahia on loan until the end of the year. He was a regular starter for the club, achieving promotion to the main category after contributing with three goals in 21 appearances.

Chapecoense (loan)
On 16 January 2017 Chapecoense signed Luiz Antônio, on loan from Flamengo, until the 2017 season. He also scored the winning goal for the side in their Libertadores debut on 7 March, a 2–1 away win against Zulia.

Al-Shabab
On 24 July 2018, Antônio joined Saudi club Al-Shabab.

Baniyas 
On 7 July 2019 , Baniyas has signed Antônio for one seasons from Al-Shabab.

Career statistics
(Correct )

Honours
Flamengo
Copa do Brasil: 2013
Campeonato Carioca: 2014

Chapecoense 
Campeonato Catarinense: 2017

References

External links
Player profile @ Flapédia 
Thaileague Official Website: Lamphun Warriors F.C. Players

1991 births
Living people
Footballers from Rio de Janeiro (city)
Brazilian footballers
Association football midfielders
Campeonato Brasileiro Série A players
Campeonato Brasileiro Série B players
Saudi Professional League players
UAE Pro League players
CR Flamengo footballers
Sport Club do Recife players
Esporte Clube Bahia players
Al-Shabab FC (Riyadh) players
Baniyas Club players
Ajman Club players
Expatriate footballers in Saudi Arabia
Brazilian expatriate sportspeople in Saudi Arabia
Brazilian expatriate sportspeople in the United Arab Emirates
Expatriate footballers in the United Arab Emirates
Associação Chapecoense de Futebol players